The 1988 All-Ireland Senior Football Championship was the 102nd staging of the All-Ireland Senior Football Championship, the Gaelic Athletic Association's premier inter-county Gaelic football tournament. The championship began on 8 May 1988 and ended on 9 October 1988.

For the second year in a row, the final was between Meath and Cork. Again, the outcome was the same, Meath winning the replay by a scoreline of 0-13 to 0-12.

Results

Connacht Senior Football Championship

Quarter-finals

Semi-finals

Final

Leinster Senior Football Championship

Preliminary round

Quarter-finals

Semi-finals

Final

Munster Senior Football Championship

Quarter-finals

Semi-finals

Final

Ulster Senior Football Championship

Preliminary round

Quarter-finals

Semi-finals

Final

All-Ireland Senior Football Championship

Semi-finals

Finals

Championship statistics

Top scorers

Overall

Single game

Miscellaneous

 Carlow's 3-5 to 2-7 defeat of Laois in the Leinster preliminary round is their first defeat of their neighbours since 1961.
 Monaghan's 0-16 to 0-14 defeat of Cavan in the Ulster quarter-final is their first defeat of their neighbours since 1930.
 The All Ireland semi-final between Cork and Monaghan was the first meeting between the teams.
 The All-Ireland final ends in a draw and goes to a replay for the first time since 1972.
 Meath were All Ireland Champions for 2 in a row and Leinster Champions for 3 in a row and they shared their 2 in a row with Galway in the Hurling.

References

All-Ireland Senior Football Championship